Aras Fatih Rasul known as Eros Kurdi and Aras Koyi (born September 26, 1972) is a Kurdish-Swedish singer, songwriter, director, scenarist, producer and philanthropist.

Early life and education 

Aras Fatih Rasul was born in Kirkuk, Iraq, though his family is originally from Koy Sanjaq, Iraq. His family was forced to leave Iraq in 1981 due to his father's political activities. His father (Fatih Rasul) a Peshmarga, faced imprisonments, and ultimately, exile. When he was a young boy, Kurdi lived in Soviet Union, where he continued his studies at Interdom in the city of Ivanovo.

After finishing high school in 1990, he moved to the Eskilstuna in Sweden where he reunited with his long-separated family. In 1993, he returned to Moscow, where he began his studies to become a film director at the Moscow State Art and Cultural University. During his studies, Kurdi began writing songs. He graduated in 1997 and moved back to his family in Sweden.

Career 

Eros' first CD single "Tap-Tap" was released in 1999. It included an English version of "Tap-Tap", a Kurdish version of "Tap-Tap (Footsteps)", the song "Nask u Nerm (Delicately, Softly)" and "Destekant Bine (Give Me Your Hands)". In 2000, Eros Kurdi started his own music company, Arasia Media Services and Production. In August 2001, he released a CD single and music video called "Tomato". It was inspired by the annual La Tomatina festival in the town of Bunol, Spain.

Discography

CD

Music Video

References

External links 

 Official Website

1972 births
Kurdish male singers
Kurdish-language singers
Living people
People from Koy Sanjaq